Madhuram is a 2021 Indian Malayalam-language romantic comedy-drama film written and directed by Ahammed Khabeer. The film stars Joju George, Shruti Ramachandran, Arjun Ashokan, Nikhila Vimal and Indrans in important roles. The film was produced by Joju George and Sijo Vadakkan under the banner of Appu Pathu Pappu Production House. The film released digitally through SonyLIV on 24 December 2021.

Premise 
The movie mainly focuses on Sabu and Kevin, the two bystanders at Kochi Medical College hospital. Sabu waits for his wife Chitra's recovery and Kevin, for his mother's surgery. The friendship between the two and other bystanders, the stories shared by each of them and how they give strength and support to each other to recover from the problems they face in life becomes the premise of the movie.

Cast 
 Joju George as Sabu
 Shruti Ramachandran as Chitra
 Arjun Ashokan as Kevin
 Nikhila Vimal as Cherie
 Indrans as Ravi
 Jaffar Idukki as Kunjikka
 Jagadish as Kevin's father 
 Lal as Doctor Rajah
 Fahim Safar as Thajudeen
 Navas Vallikkunnu as Vishnu
 Malavika Sreenath as Neethu
 Babu Jose as Chandran
 Thirumala Ramachandran as the Security
 Sminu Sijo as Kevin's mother (photo presence only)
Amrutha as Hospital reception staff nurse

Production 
The film marks the second directional of Ahammed Khabeer after the movie June. The director actually announced another movie, Insha Allah starring Joju George as his second directional. The movie was postponed due to COVID-19 protocols. Then this film was planned to be made before Insha Allah. Ahammed Khabeer announced the movie on 17 December 2020, through his social media accounts. The shooting of the movie began on 18 December 2020, after the pooja ceremony. Government Medical College Kochi, Fort Kochi and Arjun Ashokan's house were the main shooting locations. The shooting was wrapped up on 22 February 2021. Editing, sound recording, dubbing and other post-production works ended on 2 August 2021.

Jithin Stanislaus, the cinematographer of the film June did the cinematography in the film. The editing of the film was done by Mahesh Bhuvanend. Ashiq Amir and Fahim Safar worked on the script of the movie. Sameera Saneesh arranged the costumes for the movie and Ronnex Xavier handled the makeup.

The official teaser of the film starring Joju George  and Shruti Ramachandran was released on 14 February 2021, which promised that the film will be a romantic drama. The trailer of the film was released on 10 December 2021. The second trailer of the film was released on 22 December 2021, in which the release date was announced.

Music 
Hesham Abdul Wahab and Govind Vasantha composed the songs of the movie. Govind Vasantha arranged the background score in the movie. Vinayak Sasikumar and Sharfu penned the lyrics for the songs.

Reception 
The News Minute wrote that, "Ahammed Khabeer’s story is about hospital bystanders, which he has directed with beautiful visuals, especially of the food. Joju George with the help of the unfailing Indrans and a talented crew of younger actors, gives us a cosy ride with Madhuram." Anasooya of Mathrubhumi News said that, "Madhuram is all about beautiful and sweet love stories. The film has lots of emotional moments that touches our heart. Joju George requires a special mention for his excellent performance. Music and framing used in the movie are also good." Asianet News wrote that, "Madhuram' is a beautiful film that lives up to the expectations of the audience when the director arrives for his next film after June."

Sify rated the movie with 3.5 on 5 and wrote that, "Madhuram has its spectacular moments, which makes this a genuine effort. Joju George shines way ahead of the rest, with a stellar show. His chemistry with Shruti Ramachandran is so good."  Baradwaj Rangan of Film Companion wrote that, "Madhuram is a set of love stories as sweet as the title. The film is so evenly made without getting too sugary or sentimental and that is the secret of the movie's success."

References

External links 

2021 films
2020s Malayalam-language films
2021 romantic drama films
Indian romantic drama films
Films set in hospitals
Films about couples
Films shot in Kerala
Films shot in Kochi
Films not released in theaters due to the COVID-19 pandemic